Segundo Flores (6 March 1906 – 22 February 1971) was a Chilean footballer. He played in three matches for the Chile national football team in 1941. He was also part of Chile's squad for the 1941 South American Championship.

References

External links
 

1906 births
1971 deaths
Chilean footballers
Chile international footballers
Place of birth missing
Association football defenders
Colo-Colo footballers